This is a list of Australian crime-related books and media, including televisions shows and films.

Crime-related books

By author 

 Steve Bishop (2012) The Most Dangerous Detective: the Outrageous Glen Patrick Hallahan. 
Estelle Blackburn (2002) Broken Lives.
 Domenico Cacciola. 
(2009) The Second Father: An insiders story of cops, crime and corruption.
 (2013) Who's Who in the Zoo.
Matthew Condon (2013) Three Crooked Kings.
 Phil Dickie (1988) The Road to Fitzgerald.
Colleen Egan (2010) Murderer No More: Andrew Mallard and the Epic Fight that Proved his Innocence.
 Jack Herbert with Tom Gilling (2004) The Bagman: The Confessions of Jack Herbert. 
Chloe Hooper (2008) The Tall Man: Death and Life on Palm Island.
Matt Peacock (2009) Killer Company.
 Adrian Tame (1996) The Matriarch: The Kathy Pettingill Story.
Evan Whitton
(1989) The Hillbilly Dictator, Australian Broadcasting Commission.
(1994) Trial by Voodoo.
(1998) The Cartel: Lawyers and their Nine Magic Tricks.
(2005) Serial Liars: How Lawyers Get the Money and Get the Criminals Off.

Crime writers 

 Category:Australian crime writers
 Category:Australian non-fiction crime writers

Crime-related media

Films 

:Category:Australian crime films

Podcasts 

List of Australian crime podcasts

Television shows 

Category:Australian crime television series

See also
Crime in Australia

References

Books and media
Crime-related books and media
Crime-related